Odites hemipercna is a moth in the family Depressariidae. It was described by Edward Meyrick in 1914. It is found in Malawi.

The wingspan is about 10 mm. The forewings are whitish ochreous, with the margins yellowish tinged and with a wedge-shaped dark fuscous mark on the base of the costa. The first discal stigma is small and dark fuscous and there is a moderate brownish fascia from two-thirds of the costa to the tornus, edged with dark fuscous anteriorly, suffused posteriorly. There is also some fuscous irroiation in the apex and on the termen. The hindwings are light grey.

References

Moths described in 1914
Odites
Taxa named by Edward Meyrick